The Honourable Justice (R) Nasir Aslam Zahid (Urdu:ناصر اسلم زاہد); Barrister-at-Law, is a Pakistani judge who served as the Chief Justice of the Sindh High Court and then a judge of the Federal Shariat Court of Pakistan and Supreme Court of Pakistan.

He did his Bachelors from Government College of Lahore. He left Pakistan in 1954 to Cambridge for his further studies and came back in 1957. 

He gained more honor and respect when he resigned from the Supreme Court of Pakistan instead of taking the oath of office per General Pervez Musharraf's Provisional Constitutional Order (PCO).

Early life
Nasir Aslam Zahid was born in Mussoorie, near Delhi, British India. His father, Sir Zahid Hussain was a finance officer, and had also served as chancellor of Aligarh Muslim University. Later in Pakistan, his father was the first governor of the State Bank of Pakistan. He had a very supportive family of 9.

His uncle was a criminal lawyer who used to tell him stories about his daily cases. These stories built his interest in this field and that's when he decided to practice law.

Education
Nasir Aslam Zahid matriculated from Saint Patrick's High School, Karachi, did his BA degree at Government College Lahore, and went on to the University of Cambridge to study law and received a Bachelor's degree there. In 1956, he was called to the Bar from the Middle Temple. He completed his degree in 1957 and came back to Pakistan.

Career
In 1957, Barrister Zahid enrolled as an advocate of the Sindh High Court, and of the Supreme Court of Pakistan in 1962. He was then promoted to the Bench of the Sindh High Court as an Additional Judge in 1980, and in 1983 was made a permanent judge of the Sindh High Court. The Pakistan Peoples Party government temporarily removed him from the Bench in 1988 to send him off on deputation as the federal law secretary, a post he held until June 1990 when he returned to the Sindh High Court. From January 1991 to the end of April of that year, he moved to the Supreme Court as an ad hoc Judge. He had several spells as 'acting Chief Justice of Sindh', during the absence of the sitting Chief Justice, and in May 1992 took over as permanent Chief Justice.

By 1994, Justice Zahid's independence could be tolerated no more by the harsh law enforcement agencies, backed by the executive wing of the government. Zahid granted no concessions to the agencies or the government prosecuting authorities. He was transferred to the Federal Shariat Court on 16 April 1994, without his consent, for a period of two years. Later he was elevated as a permanent judge of the Supreme Court of Pakistan. However, he continued his contributions towards the dispensing of justice to the people of Pakistan until the year 2000, and then resigned from the Supreme Court of Pakistan instead of taking the oath of the office as ordered by General. Pervez Musharraf's Provisional Constitutional Order (PCO), which would have required the judges never to find illegality in the new government, no matter what actions the government took.

Contributions and social activities
He is involved in human rights issues and judicial education, and has spent much of his time since his retirement on dealing with women’s legal concerns. He has been serving as Dean, Faculty of Legal Studies, and Head of Hamdard School of Law at the Hamdard University, Karachi, since October 2000.

Justice Zahid collaborated with the Government of Sindh, Pakistan, for the establishment of a 'Committee for the Welfare of Women Prisoners' at the Special Prison for Women at Karachi. However, in 2009, the work was expanded to include Juveniles and Male Prisoners of all 22 prisons in Sindh.

In November 2006, former Justice Nasir Aslam Zahid and Naib Nazim, City of Karachi, Nasreen Jalil
announced plans to provide full legal assistance to women victims of domestic violence.

In November 2001, Governor, State Bank of Pakistan Ishrat Hussain along with Nasir Aslam Zahid announced plans to set up an annual award in memory of Nasir Aslam Zahid's father Zahid Hussain. This award would be given to deserving students and State Bank of Pakistan employees on merit basis. The family of Zahid Hussain and the State Bank of Pakistan would provide funds for this annual award.

See also
 Supreme Court of Pakistan
 Zahid Hussain (banker) (Nasir Aslam Zahid's father)
 Saeeduzzaman Siddiqui

References

External links 

Alumni of Fitzwilliam College, Cambridge
Government College University, Lahore alumni
Law school deans
Living people
Muhajir people
Pakistani barristers
Pakistani human rights activists
Chief Justices of the Sindh High Court
Pakistani lawyers
Pakistani women's rights activists
Pakistani scholars
St. Patrick's High School, Karachi alumni
Lawyers from Karachi
1934 births
Pakistani academic administrators
Justices of the Supreme Court of Pakistan